WMKI-LP is a broadcast radio station licensed to and serving Terre Haute, Indiana. WMKI-LP is owned and operated by Wabash Valley Educational Media.

References

External links
My 96-9 Online
 

2014 establishments in Indiana
Radio stations established in 2014
MKI-LP
MKI-LP